The 2nd MTV Africa Music Awards were held on October 10, 2009 at the gymnasium of the Moi International Sports Centre complex in Nairobi, Kenya and were hosted by Haitian-American artist Wyclef Jean.

Performers 

There were several performers, such as:
Wyclef Jean
Akon
HHP, Brickz and 2face Idibia
Wahu, Amani and AY
Zebra & Giraffe and Da L.E.S

Categories

Artist of the Year 
2face Idibia
D'banj
HHP
Lira
Nameless

Best Video 
2face Idibia — "Enter the Place"
Da L.E.S — "We on Fire"
HHP — "Mpitse"
XOD — "I Want You Back"
Wahu (featuring Bobi Wine) — "Little Things You Do"

Best Female 
Amani
Kel
Lira
Lizha James
Zamajobe

Best Male 
2face Idibia
Da L.E.S
D'Banj
HHP
Nameless

Best Group 
Blu*3
Gal Level
Gangs of Instrumentals
P-Square
Mo Hits Allstars

Best New Act 
M.I
Shaa
Bigiano
STL
Rhythmic Elements

Best Alternative 
aKing
Coldplay
Green Day
Cassette
Zebra & Giraffe

Best Hip Hop 
AY
M.I
Jay Z
Kanye West
Zulu Boy

Best R&B 
2face Idibia
Beyoncé
Darey Art Alade
Akon
Loyiso

Best Live Performer 
P-Square
D'banj
Samini
Nameless
Blu*3

Listener's Choice 
Nameless — "Sunshine"

My Video 
Patricke-Stevie Moungondo

Legend Award 
Lucky Dube

References 
MTV Africa Music Awards 2009 nominees
MTV Africa Music Awards 2009 winners

External links 
MTV Africa Music Awards

2009 music awards
MTV Africa Music Awards
2009 in Kenya
2009 in Africa
October 2009 events in Africa